Sport Progreso was a Peruvian football club, located in the city of Lima. The club was founded with the name of club Sport Progreso and played in Primera Division Peruana from 1912 until 1990. The club won the national tournament in 1921 and 1926. In 1933, Sport Progreso was relegated and it was their last appearance in the Primera Division Peruana.

Honors

National
Peruvian Primera División:
Winners (2): 1921, 1926
Runner-up (1): 1920

División Intermedia:
Winners (1): 1934
Runner-up (1): 1931

Liga Provincial de Lima:
Runner-up (1): 1937

See also
List of football clubs in Peru
Peruvian football league system

External links
 La difusión del fútbol en Lima (Spanish)
 RSSSF - Peru - List of Champions
 Peruvian football seasons

Association football clubs established in 1912
Football clubs in Lima
Sport Progreso